Sagornal Senior Alim Madrasha is a private madrasa, located in Sagornal, Juri Upazila, Maulvibazar District.

References 

Private schools in Bangladesh
Juri Upazila
Schools in Moulvibazar District
Alia madrasas of Bangladesh